Something Else is a children's picture book written by Kathryn Cave and illustrated by Chris Riddell.

Cave and Riddell were awarded the very first international UNESCO prize for Children's and Young People's Literature in the Service of Tolerance for Something Else.

The book was later made into a TV comic series by TV Loonland since 2001.

Plot
Something Else (the name of the protagonist and Something's best friend) is excluded from everything because he looks different. He does not play the same games, eat the same food or draw the same pictures.

Then one day Something turns up and wants to be friends. However, Something Else does not want to be friends with this creature as he believes that they are not the same and he refuses to eat sandwiches with 'Urgy stuff' in them. He sends Something away and then suddenly realizes that he acts like all the other people who always sent him away.

Eventually Something Else and Something become best friends.

Themes
 Outsiders
 Being different
 Tolerance

Translations
 German: Irgendwie Anders
 Greek: Το Κάτι Άλλο
 Italian: "Qualcos'altro"
 Hebrew   "משהו אחר"
 Slovenian: "Drugačen"
 Finnish: "Karvaiset Kaverit"
 Spanish: "Lets Anders"
 Dutch: "Andertje"
 Swedish: "Hårigt grabbar"

Theatrical adaptation
The book was adapted for the stage by Tall Stories Theatre Company, touring between 2002 and 2010.

References

British picture books
Children's fiction books
1994 children's books
British children's books